Arenostola phragmitidis, the fen wainscot, is a moth of the family Noctuidae. The species was first described by Jacob Hübner in 1803. It is found in most of Europe (except Ireland, Iceland, the Iberian Peninsula and the western part of the Balkan Peninsula), western Siberia, Turkey, Iraq, Afghanistan, Central Asia and China.

Technical description and variation

A. phragmitidis Hbn. (= semicana Esp., verecunda Ev., moravitzii Men.) (49 d). Forewing very smooth, pale ochreous, becoming pale brownish red towards termen; the fringe dark at tips; hindwing pale
greyish ochreous; — the ab. rufescens Tutt (49 d) is flushed throughout with deep flesh colour; ab. pallida Tutt (49 e), the usual British form, is smooth pale ochreous throughout; ab. olivescens ab. nov. (49 e), is 
smooth olive grey, the hindwing dark grey. Larva bone-colour; subdorsal line somewhat interrupted, broad, purplish-fuscous; lateral lines similar, but narrower; head black; thoracic plate brown. The wingspan is 32–36 mm.

Biology
Adults are on wing from July to August.

The larvae feed internally in the stems of Phragmites australis.

References

External links

Fauna Europaea
Lepiforum e.V.

Acronictinae
Moths of Europe
Moths of Asia
Taxa named by Jacob Hübner